Ljusnarsberg Municipality (Ljusnarsbergs kommun) is a municipality in Örebro County in central Sweden. Its seat is located in the town of Kopparberg.

In 1908 Kopparberg was detached from the rural municipality Ljusnarsberg to form a market town (köping). In 1962 they were reunited.

Geography 
Kopparberg is located by the outlet of the Arboga River, about 80 km north of Örebro. The municipality borders the province or landskap Dalarna to the north. One of the highest points is the mountain Gillersklack which is a popular winter resort with both downhill and cross country skiing.
Ljusnarsberg lies in a mountainous mid-lower-central district of Sweden named Bergslagen (Berg = mountain, lag = law). While Swedish municipalities typically are named after their seat, Ljusnarsberg got a different name due to Dalarna County to its north being known as Kopparberg County after a Falun copper mine until 1997.

The area has historically been a mining district.

Localities 
Town with over 50 inhabitants:
 Kopparberg, including Bångbro 3,300 (seat)
 Ställdalen 736
 Stjärnfors
 Ställberg
 Högfors
 Mossgruvan
 Hörken
 Bastkärn
 Silverhöjden
 Yxsjöberg

Economy 
One of the largest industries is the Kopparbergs Brewery, making beer and cider distributed both nation- and worldwide, and is arguably one of the best known brands of that kind in Sweden.

The municipality is part of a regional KNÖL-group (acronym for Kommuner i Norra Örebro Län), consisting of Ljusnarsberg Municipality, Nora Municipality, Lindesberg Municipality and Hällefors Municipality.

Riksdag elections

Demographics

2022
This is a demographic table based on Ljusnarsberg Municipality's electoral districts in the 2022 Swedish general election sourced from SVT's election platform, in turn taken from SCB official statistics.

Residents include everyone registered as living in the district, regardless of age or citizenship status. Valid voters indicate Swedish citizens above the age of 18 who therefore can vote in general elections. Left vote and right vote indicate the result between the two major blocs in said district in the 2022 general election. Employment indicates the share of people between the ages of 20 and 64 who are working taxpayers. Foreign background denotes residents either born abroad or with two parents born outside of Sweden. Median income is the received monthly income through either employment, capital gains or social grants for the median adult above 20, also including pensioners in Swedish kronor. College graduates indicates any degree accumulated after high school.

In total there were 4,598 residents with 3,568 Swedish citizen adults eligible to vote. The political demographics were 43.2 % for the left bloc and 54.5 % for the right bloc. Ljusnarsberg is a low-income municipality with high levels of unemployment and relatively few college graduates. There is a relatively high proportion of people with foreign background at about 23 %, quite evenly spread throughout the districts.

Twin towns
Ljusnarsberg's three twin towns with the year of its establishing:

(1944) Lapinlahti, Finland 
(1949) Aars, Denmark 
(1949) Sunndalsøra, Norway

See also
Independent Municipal Party of Ljusnarsberg

References

External links 

Ljusnarsberg Municipality - Official site

Municipalities of Örebro County